is a Buddhist temple located in the city of Chōshi in Chiba Prefecture. According to tradition, the temple was founded by Kūkai between 810 and 824 AD, and possibly sits on the site of a former temple called Iinuma-ji. According to tradition, in this period Kūkai built a  main hall and conducted services at the temple. Enpuku-ji is the 27th station on the Bandō Sanjūsankasho circuit of temples in Eastern Japan, sacred to Goddess Kannon. The majority of buildings in the temple complex were destroyed during the aerial bombing of Chōshi in World War II.

Cultural Treasures
Important Cultural Property of Japan
, a Heian period cast-bronze gong used for Buddhist rituals. Currently housed at the Nara National Museum
Chiba Prefectural Cultural Property
  carrying the nengō "Kyōtoku 11" (i.e., the 11th year of the Kyōtoku period, 1462)
Shaka Nehan-zu, a Buddhist scroll in three parts

Order in Buddhist pilgrimages 

Enpuku-ji is the 27th temple in the Bandō Sanjūsankasho, a pilgrimage circuit of 33 Buddhist temples in the Kantō region of eastern Japan dedicated to the Bodhisattva Kannon.

Sources

References

External links 
真言宗飯沼山　円福寺 
第27番　飯沼山 円福寺(飯沼観音)  

Religious organizations established in the 9th century
Buddhist temples in Chiba Prefecture
Buildings and structures in Japan destroyed during World War II
Chōshi